Crystal Gayle Sings the Heart and Soul of Hoagy Carmichael is Crystal Gayle’s tribute to the songwriter Hoagy Carmichael. It was released on November 2, 1999 on Intersound Records.

Track listing

Personnel
 Charles Cochran - piano
 Eric Darken - percussion
 Jim Ferguson - bass
 Dennis Good - trombone
 Jennifer Kummer - French horn
 Jay Patten - rhythm guitar, alto saxophone
 Ann Richards - flute
 Robbie Shankle - clarinet
 Denis Solee - tenor saxophone, clarinet
 Liz Stewart - bass
 Bobby Taylor - oboe
 George Tidwell - trumpet
 Jim White - drums
Cello:
 John Catchings
 Anthony LaMarchina
 Bob Mason
 Julie Tanner
Viola
 Monisa Angell
 Bruce Christensen
 Chris Farrell
 Jim Grosjean
 Dede Jacobs
 Gary Vanosdale
Violin
 Janet Askey
 David Angell
 David Davidson
 Conni Ellisor
 Carl Gorodetzky
 Gerald Greer
 Cate Myer
 Pamela Sixfin
 Mary Kathryn Vanosdale
 Alan Umstead
 Cathy Umstead
 Carrie Wann

Crystal Gayle albums
1999 albums
Tribute albums
Albums produced by Crystal Gayle